Henry Douglas Stephens (26 June 1877 – 17 June 1952) was an Australian paediatric surgeon.

He was born in Williamstown, Melbourne to John Charles Stephens, a newspaper owner, and his wife Kate. He was dux of Camberwell Grammar School and graduated from the University of Melbourne in 1900.   On 6 September 1911 he married Eileen Cole.

He served at the Royal Children's Hospital for forty-five years and the Henry Douglas Stephens Memorial Operating Theatre was named in his honour. He was also a consultant paediatrician at the Women's Hospital, Melbourne, from 1931 to 1945.  He co-founded the Melbourne Paediatric Society.  From 1935 to 1940 he was Dean of the Clinical School at the Royal Children's Hospital, and he was a councillor of the Royal Victorian College of Nursing and the Victorian Society for Crippled Children.

He had three daughters and a son, Frank Douglas Stephens.

References
 Medical Journal of Australia, 20 Sept 1952
 Victorian Historical Magazine, v33, no 1, Aug 1962

External links
 Australian Dictionary of Biography Entry

1877 births
1952 deaths
People educated at Camberwell Grammar School
Australian paediatric surgeons
Melbourne Medical School alumni
20th-century surgeons
Medical doctors from Melbourne
People from Williamstown, Victoria